Weston is a historic home and farm located near Casanova, Fauquier County, Virginia.  The original section of the house was built about 1810, with additions made in 1860, 1870, and 1893.  The original section was a simple, -story, log house.  A -story frame and weatherboard addition was built in 1860, and a -story frame and weatherboard rear ell was added in 1870.  In 1893, a two-story frame and weatherboard addition was built, making the house "L"-shaped.  This section features a steeply-pitched gable roof with gable dormers and decoratively
sawn bargeboards and eaves trim—common characteristics of the Carpenter Gothic style. Also on the property are a number of contributing 19th century outbuildings including the kitchen / wash house, smokehouse, spring house, tool house, blacksmith shop, stable, and barn.  Weston is open as a house and farm museum.

It was listed on the National Register of Historic Places in 1996.

Gallery

References

External links

Weston Farmstead website

History museums in Virginia
Houses on the National Register of Historic Places in Virginia
Farms on the National Register of Historic Places in Virginia
Gothic Revival architecture in Virginia
Houses completed in 1893
Houses in Fauquier County, Virginia
National Register of Historic Places in Fauquier County, Virginia
Museums in Fauquier County, Virginia
Blacksmith shops